Güssefeld is a village and a former municipality in the district Altmarkkreis Salzwedel, in Saxony-Anhalt, Germany. Since 1 January 2009, it has been part of the town of Kalbe.

Former municipalities in Saxony-Anhalt
Kalbe, Saxony-Anhalt